Isabel Albert (born 10 May 1995) is a Luxembourger footballer who plays as a forward for Dames Ligue 1 club Munsbach and the Luxembourg women's national team.

International career
Albert made her senior debut for Luxembourg on 20 September 2020 during a 0–3 friendly loss against Bulgaria.

References

1995 births
Living people
Women's association football forwards
Luxembourgian women's footballers
Luxembourg women's international footballers